Alexsandro Pereira (born 7 July 1987) is a Brazilian professional mixed martial artist and former kickboxer. He currently competes in the Middleweight division in the Ultimate Fighting Championship (UFC), where he is the current UFC Middleweight Champion. In kickboxing, he is a former Glory middleweight and light heavyweight champion, and is the first and only fighter to have held Glory titles in two weight classes simultaneously. Pereira also competed in promotions such as It's Showtime and SUPERKOMBAT Fighting Championship. As of March 7, 2023, he is #7 in the UFC men's pound-for-pound rankings.

Pereira was ranked #1 in the kickboxing middleweight and light-heavyweight rankings as of February 2021.

Early life
Growing up in a favela, Pereira dropped out of middle school to begin working in a tire shop at the age of 12. Influenced by his colleagues, he began drinking and eventually became an alcoholic. In 2009 he began training kickboxing in order to get rid of his addiction.

Kickboxing career
He won the Glory 14: Zagreb - Middleweight Contender Tournament in Zagreb, Croatia on 8 March 2014, beating Dustin Jacoby by first-round knockout in the semi-finals and Sahak Parparyan by majority decision in the final.

It was announced during the Glory 15: Istanbul broadcast that Pereira would be one of eight fighters competing in the Glory 17: Los Angeles - Last Man Standing middleweight tournament in Inglewood, California, United States on 21 June 2014. He lost to eventual champion Artem Levin by unanimous decision in the quarter-finals to exit the tournament.

He was scheduled to fight a rematch with César Almeida during WGP Kickboxing 25 for the vacant belt WGP Middleweight title. He defeated Almeida by decision. He defended his WGP KB title with a second-round KO of Maycon Silva at WGP KB 40.

In his next five fights, Pereira went on a 4–1 run, losing only to the pound for pound great Artur Kyshenko. During this run Pereira achieved his most famous victories, defeating the future UFC Middleweight champion Israel Adesanya twice: once by unanimous decision, and once by a counter left hook KO.

Pereira won the Glory Middleweight title with a unanimous decision win against Simon Marcus at Glory 46: China.

Glory Middleweight Championship
Pereira met Yousri Belgaroui at the Glory 40 and Glory 49 Superfight Series, and then in 2018 in New York Madison Square Garden at the Glory 55 for the Middleweight Title Match, where Belgaroui had received the overhand right knockout at 2:29 of Round 1. For Pereira, it was the 28th career victory and the sixth inside the Glory ring.

In November 2018, Pereira said he would pursue MMA career after his contract with Glory will expire in April 2019. Eventually, Pereira re-signed with Glory with possibility to fight in the mixed martial arts also.

After four straight successful Glory middleweight title defenses (against Yousri Belgaroui, Simon Marcus and Jason Wilnis), Pereira moved up to fight Donegi Abena for the interim Glory Light Heavyweight Championship at Glory 68. Pereira won the fight via knockout in the third round, becoming the first double champion in Glory history.

After winning the Light Heavyweight Championship, Pereira opted to defend his middleweight title against Ertugrul Bayrak at Glory Collision 2 on 21 December 2019. After largely dominating the first round, he won the bout via knockout at the end of the round.

Glory Light Heavyweight Championship
Pereira was scheduled to challenge Artem Vakhitov for the Glory Light Heavyweight title at Glory 77. Pereira won the fight by split decision, becoming the first fighter in GLORY history to simultaneously hold two belts at the same time.

Pereira was later stripped of his Middleweight title.

Pereira rematched Artem Vakhitov at Glory 78: Rotterdam in his first title defense. He lost the rematch by majority decision. Pereira was deducted one point in round 4 due to repeated clinching, which was seen by many as a controversial decision by the referee.

Mixed martial arts career

Early career
Transitioning from kickboxing, Pereira made his professional mixed martial arts debut in 2015 at Jungle Fight 82 against , losing the fight via submission. He continued at Jungle Fight where subsequently racking up two straight victories against Marcelo Cruz and Marcus Vinicius Silveira, with a KO and TKO respectively. Pereira announced he had signed a contract to face Diego Henrique da Silva in the Brazilian edition of Dana White's Contender Series on August 10, 2018. However, the bout never materialized as Glory did not permit Pereira to compete.

On October 22, 2020, news surfaced that Pereira had signed a contract with Legacy Fighting Alliance and he then made his promotional debut against Thomas Powell on November 20, 2020. He won the fight via knockout in round one.

Ultimate Fighting Championship
On September 3, 2021, Pereira signed with the UFC. He made his promotional debut against Andreas Michailidis on November 6, 2021, at UFC 268. He won the fight via technical knock out in round two. This win earned him a Performance of the Night award.

Pereira faced Bruno Silva on March 12, 2022, at UFC Fight Night 203. Pereira outstruck Silva for all three rounds and won the fight via unanimous decision.

Pereira was scheduled to face Sean Strickland on July 30, 2022, at UFC 277. However, the promotion decided to move the pairing to UFC 276 on July 2, 2022. Pereira won the fight after knocking Strickland out in the first round. This win earned him a Performance of the Night award, and Crypto.com Fan Bonus of the Night third place award which paid in bitcoin of US$10,000.

UFC Middleweight Championship
Pereira faced Israel Adesanya for the UFC Middleweight Championship on November 12, 2022, at UFC 281. He won the bout via technical knockout in the fifth round. This win earned him the Performance of the Night award.

A rematch is scheduled between Pereira and Adesanya for the UFC Middleweight Championship on Apr 8, 2023, at UFC 287.

Personal life

Alex Pereira has indigenous ancestry from the Pataxó tribe.  His nickname is Alex "Poatan" Pereira, in the Tupi language, "Poatan" means "Stone Hands". The nickname was given by his first kickboxing trainer Belocqua Wera, who was also responsible for helping Pereira discover his indigenous ancestry., which however is not the ethnic language of the Pataxó.

Pereira quit drinking alcohol in 2012. He has a younger sister, Aline Pereira, who competes for Glory and had her MMA debut on November 18, 2022.

Championships and awards

Mixed martial arts
Ultimate Fighting Championship
UFC Middleweight Championship (One time; current)
 Performance of the Night (Three times) 
MMAjunkie.com
2022 July Knockout of the Month 
2022 Male Fighter of the Year
2022 Breakout Fighter of the Year
ESPN
2022 Male Fighter of the Year
Sherdog
2022 Breakthrough Fighter of the Year
2022 Fighter of the Year
MMA Fighting
 2022 Male Fighter of the Year
Sports Illustrated
2022 Breakout Fighter of the Year
Yahoo! Sports
2022 Male Fighter of the Year
MMA Mania
2022 Fighter of the Year
Combat Press
2022 Male Fighter of the Year

Kickboxing
Professional
Glory
 2021 Glory Light Heavyweight Champion
 2019 Glory interim Light Heavyweight Champion
 2017 Glory Middleweight Champion (five defenses)
 2014 Glory Middleweight Contender Tournament Winner
WGP Kickboxing
 2015 WGP Kickboxing Middleweight Champion
 2012 WGP -85 kg/187 lb Championship
World Association of Kickboxing Organizations
 2013 WAKO Pro Panamerican K-1 -85 kg/187 lb Champion

Amateur
World Association of Kickboxing Organizations
 2013 silver medal in WAKO World Championships in Guaruja, Brasil K-1 -91 kg 

Awards
Glory
 Glory Fighter of the Year 2019

Combat Press
 2017 Fight of the Year (vs. Israel Adesanya)
 2019 Knockout of the Year

Mixed martial arts record

|Win
|align=center|7–1
|Israel Adesanya
|TKO (punches)
|UFC 281
|
|align=center|5
|align=center|2:01
|New York City, New York, United States
|
|-
|Win
|align=center|6–1
|Sean Strickland
|KO (punches)
|UFC 276
|
|align=center|1
|align=center|2:36
|Las Vegas, Nevada, United States
|
|-
|Win
|align=center|5–1
|Bruno Silva
|Decision (unanimous)
|UFC Fight Night: Santos vs. Ankalaev
|
|align=center|3
|align=center|5:00
|Las Vegas, Nevada, United States
|
|-
|Win
|align=center|4–1
|Andreas Michailidis
|TKO (flying knee and punches)
|UFC 268
|
|align=center|2
|align=center|0:18
|New York City, New York, United States
|
|-
|Win
|align=center|3–1
|Thomas Powell
|KO (punch)
|LFA 95
|20 November 2020
|align=center|1
|align=center|4:04
|Park City, Kansas, United States
|
|-
|Win
|align=center|2–1
|Marcus Vinicius da Silveira
|TKO (punches)
|Jungle Fight 87
|21 May 2016
|align=center|2
|align=center|4:55
|São Paulo, Brazil
|
|-
|Win
|align=center|1–1
|Marcelo Cruz
|KO (punches)
|Jungle Fight 85
|23 January 2016
|align=center|1
|align=center|4:07
|São Paulo, Brazil
|
|-
|Loss
|align=center|0–1
|Quemuel Ottoni
|Submission (rear-naked choke)
|Jungle Fight 82
|24 October 2015
|align=center|3
|align=center|2:52
|São Paulo, Brazil
|

Kickboxing record

|-  style="background:#fbb;"
| 2021-09-04 || Loss ||align=left| Artem Vakhitov || Glory 78: Rotterdam || Rotterdam, Netherlands || Decision (Majority) || 5 || 3:00
|-
! style=background:white colspan=9 |
|-  bgcolor="#CCFFCC"
| 2021-01-30 || Win ||align=left| Artem Vakhitov || Glory 77: Rotterdam || Rotterdam, Netherlands || Decision (Split) || 5 || 3:00
|-
! style=background:white colspan=9 |
|-  bgcolor="#CCFFCC"
| 2019-12-21|| Win||align=left| Ertugrul Bayrak || Glory Collision 2 || Arnhem, Netherlands || KO (Left Hook) || 1 || 3:00
|-
! style=background:white colspan=9 |
|-  bgcolor= "#CCFFCC"
| 2019-09-28|| Win ||align=left| Donegi Abena || Glory 68: Miami || Miami, United States || KO (Left Hook) || 3 || 2:08 
|-
! style=background:white colspan=9 |
|-  bgcolor= "#CCFFCC"
| 2019-05-17|| Win ||align=left| Jason Wilnis || Glory 65: Utrecht || Utrecht, Netherlands || KO (Left Flying Knee) || 1 || 1:31 
|-
! style=background:white colspan=9 |
|-
|-  bgcolor= "#CCFFCC"
| 2018-09-14|| Win ||align=left| Simon Marcus || Glory 58: Chicago || Chicago, United States || Decision (Unanimous) || 5 || 3:00 
|-
! style=background:white colspan=9 |
|-
|-  bgcolor= "#CCFFCC"
| 2018-07-20|| Win ||align=left| Yousri Belgaroui || Glory 55: New York || New York, United States || KO (Right Hook) || 1 || 2:16 
|-
! style=background:white colspan=9 |
|-
|-  bgcolor= "#CCFFCC"
| 2017-12-09|| Win ||align=left| Yousri Belgaroui || Glory 49: Rotterdam || Rotterdam, Netherlands || TKO (Doctor Stoppage) || 3 || 1:54 
|-
! style=background:white colspan=9 |
|-
|-  bgcolor= "#CCFFCC"
| 2017-10-14|| Win ||align=left| Simon Marcus || Glory 46: China || Guangzhou, China || Decision (Unanimous)|| 5 || 3:00 
|-
! style=background:white colspan=9 |
|-
|-  bgcolor= "#CCFFCC"
| 2017-09-16|| Win ||align=left| Maycon Silva || WGP Kickboxing 40 || Paraná, Brazil || KO (Left Hook)|| 2 || 2:00 
|-
! style=background:white colspan=9 |
|-
|-  bgcolor= "#FFBBBB"
| 2017-04-29 || Loss ||align=left| Yousri Belgaroui || Glory 40: Copenhagen, Final ||Copenhagen, Denmark || Decision (Unanimous)  || 3 || 3:00
|- 
|-  bgcolor= "#CCFFCC"
| 2017-04-29 || Win ||align=left| Burim Rama || Glory 40: Copenhagen, Semi Final || Copenhagen, Denmark || TKO (Right Hook)  || 3 || 1:42
|- 
|-  bgcolor= "#CCFFCC"
| 2017-03-04 || Win||align=left| Israel Adesanya  || Glory of Heroes 7 || Sao Paulo, Brazil || KO (Left Hook)|| 3 || N/A
|-
|-  bgcolor="#FFBBBB"
| 2016-07-31 || Loss ||align=left| Artur Kyshenko || Kunlun Fight 48 || Jining, China || TKO (Punches) || 2 || 2:55
|-
|-
|-  bgcolor= "#CCFFCC"
| 2016-05-08 || Win ||align=left| Junior Alpha || WGP Kickboxing 30 || Brazil || KO (Right Hook) || 4 || N/A
|-
|-
|-  bgcolor= "#CCFFCC"
| 2016-04-02 || Win ||align=left| Israel Adesanya || Glory of Heroes 1 || China || Decision (Unanimous) || 5 || N/A
|-
|-
|-  bgcolor= "#CCFFCC"
| 2015-07-25 || Win ||align=left| César Almeida || WGP Kickboxing 25 || São Paulo, Brazil || Decision || 5 || 3:00 
|-
! style=background:white colspan=9 |
|-  bgcolor="#FFBBBB"
| 2015-04-03 || Loss ||align=left| Jason Wilnis || Glory 20: Dubai - Middleweight Contender Tournament, Semi Finals || Dubai, UAE || Decision (Unanimous) || 3 || 3:00
|-
|-  bgcolor= "#CCFFCC"
| 2014-12-20 || Win ||align=left| Ivan Galaz || WGP Kickboxing 24 || São Paulo, Brazil ||TKO (Three Knockdowns) || 2 || N/A
|-
|-  bgcolor= "#CCFFCC"
| 2014-09-27 || Win ||align=left| Robert Thomas || WGP Kickboxing 22  || Brazil || Decision (Unanimous) || 3 || 3:00
|-
|-  bgcolor="#FFBBBB"
| 2014-06-21 || Loss ||align=left| Artem Levin || Glory 17: Los Angeles - Middleweight Last Man Standing Tournament, Quarter Finals || Inglewood, California, USA || Decision (Unanimous) || 3 || 3:00
|-
|-  bgcolor= "#CCFFCC"
| 2014-04-26 || Win ||align=left| Aleksandr Dmitrenko || WGP SUPER 4  || São Paulo, Brazil ||Decision (Unanimous) || 3 || 3:00
|-
|-  bgcolor= "#CCFFCC"
| 2014-03-08 || Win ||align=left| Sahak Parparyan || Glory 14: Zagreb - Middleweight Contender Tournament, Final || Zagreb, Croatia ||Decision (Majority) || 3 || 3:00
|-
! style=background:white colspan=9 |
|-
|-  bgcolor= "#CCFFCC"
| 2014-03-08 ||Win ||align=left| Dustin Jacoby || Glory 14: Zagreb - Middleweight Contender Tournament, Semi Finals || Zagreb, Croatia || KO (Left Hook) || 1 || 2:02
|-
|-  bgcolor="#FFBBBB"
| 2013-12-21 || Loss ||align=left| César Almeida || WGP Kickboxing 17, Final || São Paulo, Brazil || Decision || 3 || N/A
|-
|-  bgcolor="#CCFFCC"
| 2013-12-21 || Win ||align=left| Camilo Ferraz || WGP Kickboxing 17, Semi Final || São Paulo, Brazil || KO (Right Knee) || 1 || N/A
|-
|-  bgcolor="#CCFFCC"
| 2013-08-24 || Win ||align=left| Matías Adaro || WGP Kickboxing 15 || São Paulo, Brazil || KO (Right Cross) || 2 ||  N/A
|-
! style=background:white colspan=9 |
|-
|-  bgcolor="#CCFFCC"
| 2013-03-23 || Win ||align=left| César Almeida || SUPERKOMBAT New Heroes 2 || São Caetano, Brazil || Decision (Unanimous) || 3 || N/A
|-
|-  bgcolor="#FFBBBB"
| 2012-11-10 || Loss ||align=left| Jason Wilnis || It's Showtime 60 || São Paulo, Brazil || TKO (Retirement) || 2 || N/A
|-
! style=background:white colspan=9 |
|-
|-  bgcolor="#CCFFCC"
| 2012-09-16 || Win ||align=left| Felipe Micheletti || WGP Kickboxing 9 || São Paulo, Brazil || Decision (Unanimous) || 3 || N/A
|-
|-  bgcolor="#CCFFCC"
| 2012-07-07 || Win ||align=left| Clei Silva || WGP Kickboxing, Final || São Paulo, Brazil || Decision || 3 || N/A
|-
! style=background:white colspan=9 |
|-
|-  bgcolor="#CCFFCC"
| 2012-07-07 || Win ||align=left| Fabio Alberto || WGP Kickboxing, Semi finals || São Paulo, Brazil || KO || 1 || N/A
|-
|-  bgcolor="#CCFFCC"
| 2012-03-31 || Win ||align=left| Clei Silva || Jungle Fight 37 || São Paulo, Brazil || Decision (Unanimous) || 3 || N/A
|-
|-
! style=background:white colspan=9 |
|-

|-
|-  bgcolor="#FFBBBB"
| 2013-10 || Loss ||align=left| Sergej Maslobojev || W.A.K.O World Championships 2013, K-1 Final -91 kg  || Guaruja, Brasil || Decision || 3 || 2:00
|-
! style=background:white colspan=9 |
|-
|-  bgcolor="#CCFFCC"
| 2013-10 || Win ||align=left| Mattia Faraoni || W.A.K.O World Championships 2013, K-1 Semi Finals -91 kg  || Guaruja, Brasil || Decision (Split) ||3 || 2:00
|-
|-  bgcolor="#CCFFCC"
| 2013-10 || Win ||align=left| Selby Devereux || W.A.K.O World Championships 2013, K-1 Quarter Finals -91 kg  || Guaruja, Brasil || N/A || N/A || N/A
|-
| colspan=9 | Legend:

Professional boxing record

See also
 List of current UFC fighters

External links

References

External links
 
 
 Official Glory profile

1987 births
Living people
People from São Bernardo do Campo
Sportspeople from São Paulo (state)
Brazilian male kickboxers
Brazilian male boxers
Brazilian male mixed martial artists
Mixed martial artists utilizing boxing
Mixed martial artists utilizing kickboxing
Middleweight kickboxers
Light heavyweight kickboxers
Glory kickboxers
SUPERKOMBAT kickboxers
Kunlun Fight kickboxers
Brazilian people of indigenous peoples descent
Ultimate Fighting Championship male fighters
Kickboxing champions
Ultimate Fighting Championship champions